Mai-Ndombe is one of the 21 new provinces of the Democratic Republic of the Congo created in the 2015 repartitioning.  Mai-Ndombe, Kwango, and Kwilu provinces are the result of the dismemberment of the former Bandundu province.  Mai-Ndombe was formed from the Plateaux and Mai-Ndombe districts.  The town of Inongo was elevated to capital city of the new province.

History 
Mai-Ndombe Province was a separate province from 1962 to 1966, prior the creation of Bandundu Province from the post-colonial political regions of Kwango, Kwilu, and Mai-Ndombe.
Presidents (from 1965, governors) were:
 8 Sep 1962 -    Dec 1963  Victor Kumoriko
 23 Sep 1963 - 11 Oct 1963    V. Bola (in rebellion)
 Jan 1964 -    Dec 1964  Gabriël Zangabie
       1964 -        1965  ...
27 Jul 1965 - 25 Apr 1966  Daniël Mongiya
A whaling vessel sank in the province in 2021, killing at least 60 people.

Geography 
Currently, there are 8 territories in Mai-Ndombe province, which are:

 Bolobo 
 Inongo
 Kiri
 Kutu
 Kwamouth 
 Mushie 
 Oshwe 
 Yumbi

References

 01
Provinces of the Democratic Republic of the Congo
Former provinces of the Democratic Republic of the Congo (pre-1966)